Abahaṭ‌ṭha, Abahatta or Avahaṭṭha (Prakrit: abasaṭ‌ṭa, ultimately from Sanskrit apaśabda 'meaningless sound') is a stage in the evolution of the Eastern group of the Indo-Aryan languages. The eastern group consists of languages such as Assamese, Bengali, Bhojpuri, Magahi, Maithili, and Odia. Abahatta is considered to follow the Apabhraṃśa stage, i.e. those Apabhraṃśas derived from Magadhi Prakrit.

After different business and trading classes such as the Jains gained in power in the end of ninth century, the dominant position of classical Sanskrit waned; Apabhransa and Abahatta became very popular, especially among common people. It functioned as a lingua franca throughout the northern half of the Indian subcontinent.
Abahatta, which existed from the 6th century to the 14th century, was contemporaneous with some Apabhraṃśas as well as the early modern languages such as Old Odia, Old Bengali and Old Assamese. Many poets composed both in Abahatta and a modern language such as the Charyapada poets, who wrote dohas or short religious verses in Abahatta; the Maithili poet Vidyapati wrote his poem Kirtilata in Abahatta. Many works authored in Abahatta were translated into Sanskrit, and some texts were also written using multiple languages, such as Somprabha's "Kumarpala-pratibodha" in 1195 CE.

The Abahattha stage is characterized by:
Loss of affixes and suffixes
Loss of grammatical gender
Increased usage of short vowels
Nasalisation at the end or in the middle of words
The substitution of h for s

References

External links 
 

Eastern Indo-Aryan languages
Languages attested from the 6th century
Languages extinct in the 14th century